Quararibea jefensis is a species of flowering plant in the family Malvaceae. It is found only in Panama. It is threatened by habitat loss.

References

jefensis
Endemic flora of Panama
Critically endangered flora of North America
Taxonomy articles created by Polbot
Taxobox binomials not recognized by IUCN